Vilamarín is a municipality in the Spanish province of Ourense. It has a population of 1996 (20166) and an area of 56 km².

References  

Municipalities in the Province of Ourense